So Sad About Gloria, also known as Visions of Evil is a 1973 American horror film directed by Harry Thomason and starring Lori Saunders, Robert Ginnaven, and Dean Jagger. Its plot follows a mentally unstable woman who has visions of herself at the center of brutal axe murders.

Cast
Lori Saunders as Gloria Wellman
Robert Ginnaven as Chris Kenner
Dean Jagger as Fredrick Wellman
Lou Hoffman as the Psychiatrist

Production
The film was shot on location in 1972 in the Ozarks region of Arkansas.

References

External links

1973 films
1973 horror films
American psychological horror films
Fiction with unreliable narrators
Films shot in Arkansas
1970s English-language films
Films directed by Harry Thomason
1970s American films